Avelino Trifón Guillén Jáuregui (born 10 November 1954), is a Peruvian lawyer and politician. Since 4 November 2021, he has been Minister of the Interior of Peru in the Pedro Castillo government.

References

Living people
1954 births
Government ministers of Peru
21st-century Peruvian politicians
University of San Martín de Porres alumni
People from Apurímac Region
20th-century Peruvian lawyers